Leptotes harryphillipsii is a species of orchid endemic to southeastern Brazil.

References

External links 

harryphillipsii
Endemic orchids of Brazil